Alfred Asmussen Clauscen (27 May 1875 – 22 August 1948) was an Australian rules footballer who played for the St Kilda Football Club in the Victorian Football League (VFL).

References

External links 

1875 births
1948 deaths
Australian rules footballers from Melbourne
St Kilda Football Club players
People from Abbotsford, Victoria